Fred Talbot (born 1949) is a British former teacher and television presenter.

Fred or Fredrick Talbot(t) may also refer to:
Fred Talbot (baseball) (1941–2013), Major League Baseball player
Frederic Talbot (1819–1907), American businessman
Frederick Talbot, rugby league footballer of the 1930s for Wales, Huddersfield, and Keighley
Fred Talbott (1843–1918), U.S. congressman
Frederick Hilborn Talbot, Permanent Representative of Guyana to the United Nations